is a concrete arch dam in the city of Takayama, in the Gifu Prefecture of Japan. It supports a 340 MW hydroelectric power station.

The dam is located in the upstream region of the Hida River, which is part of the Kiso River system. The dam was constructed exclusively for hydroelectric power generation and is managed by the Chubu Electric Power Company. It is the highest dam on the Hida River, with a height of 133 meters. The reservoir created by the dam also serves as pumped storage facility for the Takane Daiichi Power Station, and with a lower adjustment reservoir directly downstream created by the Takane No.2 Dam, forms the largest hydropower station in the Hida River basin with a maximum of 340,000 kilowatts of power generation.

69 houses were flooded.

References

Dams in Gifu Prefecture
Hydroelectric power stations in Japan
Dams completed in 1969
Arch dams
Energy infrastructure completed in 1969
Takayama, Gifu